Lee Min-ho (born June 22, 1987) is a South Korean actor and singer.

Discography

Extended plays

Single albums

Singles

Videography

References

Discographies of South Korean artists